The 2023 IIHF Women's World Championship Division III comprises two international ice hockey tournaments of the 2023 Women's Ice Hockey World Championships organised by the International Ice Hockey Federation (IIHF).

The Group A tournament will be played in Brașov, Romania from 3 to 9 April, and the Group B tournament in Tnuvot, Israel, from 26 to 31 March 2023.

Group A tournament

Participants

Standings

Results
All times are local (UTC+3)

Group B tournament

Participants

Standings

Results
All times are local (UTC+3)

References

2023
Division III
2023 IIHF Women's World Championship Division III
2023 IIHF Women's World Championship Division III
Sport in Brașov
2023 in Romanian sport
2023 in Israeli sport
IIHF
IIHF
IIHF